The Silsilat-al-nasab-i Safaviya, also spelled Selselat an-Nasab-e Safaviyye (meaning Genealogy of the Safavid dynasty) was written by Sheikh Pir Husayn 'Abd az-Zahidi, a 17th-century descendant of Sheikh Zahed Gilani, during the reign of Shah Sulayman. This hagiography, in praise of the Safavid forebearers, was devoted to the genealogy of Safavid Sufi masters.

Safaviyeh order